Montgomery Township is a township in Montgomery County, Pennsylvania.  It is the location of the Montgomery Mall, a regional shopping mall serving the Route 309 corridor of the Philadelphia suburbs. Much of Montgomery Township's development is suburban in character, with newer tract houses and strip shopping centers. Homes in Montgomery Township have North Wales and Lansdale (although the township is distinct from those boroughs) addresses, but businesses that are located within the township boundaries are given the Montgomeryville ZIP Code. The township is in the North Penn School District and is part of the North Penn Valley region that is centered around the borough of Lansdale.

Montgomery Township is the largest municipality in the North Penn area, the ninth largest municipality in Montgomery County, and the 59th largest municipality in Pennsylvania. Montgomery Township has its downtown along PA 309 in Montgomery Square. The township is largely developed with many suburban developments. It has an area of 10.7 square miles and a population of 24,790. It was incorporated on May 17, 1714.

History
Montgomery Township was incorporated in 1714. Alexander Edwards was certainly one of the first settlers, and probably the very earliest in Montgomery. Originally from Wales, he died in 1712 and described himself in his will as "of Montgomery", showing that the township had been created before that time, When old Philadelphia County was partitioned on September 10, 1784, Montgomery Township was included in Montgomery County. There were many Welsh within Montgomery and its surrounding townships, descendants of those who left Wales in the aftermath of the English Civil War. The new county was likely named for the historic county of Montgomeryshire, Wales, where many of the earliest Welsh settlers hailed from.

The Knapp Farm was listed on the National Register of Historic Places in 1976.

Geography
According to the U.S. Census Bureau, the township has a total area of 10.7 square miles (27.6 km2), all  land. It is in the Delaware watershed and is drained mainly by the Little Neshaminy Creek. Its villages include Christy (also in Bucks County), Colmar (also in Hatfield Township), Eureka (also in Bucks County and Horsham Township), Fortuna (also in Hatfield Township), Montgomery Square, and Montgomeryville. Pennsylvania Route 63 (Welsh Road) follows a portion of the southwestern boundary of the township.

Neighboring municipalities
Horsham Township (southeast)
Lower Gwynedd Township (south)
Upper Gwynedd Township (southwest)
Lansdale (west)
Hatfield Township (northwest)
New Britain Township, Bucks County (north)
Warrington Township, Bucks County (northeast)

Climate
Montgomery Township has a hot-summer humid continental climate (Dfa) and the hardiness zones are 6b and 7a with the dividing line on a ridge at roughly Stump Road.  The average monthly temperature in Montgomeryville ranges from 29.9 °F in January to 74.3 °F in July.

Demographics

As of the 2010 census, the township was 76.7% White, 4.6% Black or African American, 0.1% Native American, 16.6% Asian, and 1.6% were two or more races. 2.2% of the population were of Hispanic or Latino ancestry.

As of the census of 2000, there were 22,025 people, 7,926 households, and 6,055 families residing in the township.  The population density was 2,067.1 people per square mile (797.7/km2).  There were 8,053 housing units at an average density of 755.8/sq mi (291.7/km2).  The racial makeup of the township was 85.60% White, 3.87% African American, 0.07% Native American, 9.19% Asian, 0.01% Pacific Islander, 0.28% from other races, and 0.98% from two or more races. Hispanic or Latino of any race were 1.27% of the population.

There were 7,926 households, out of which 39.9% had children under the age of 18 living with them, 68.5% were married couples living together, 5.9% had a female householder with no husband present, and 23.6% were non-families. 19.7% of all households were made up of individuals, and 6.5% had someone living alone who was 65 years of age or older.  The average household size was 2.74 and the average family size was 3.20.

In the township, the population was spread out, with 28.4% under the age of 18, 4.0% from 18 to 24, 34.5% from 25 to 44, 21.8% from 45 to 64, and 11.3% who were 65 years of age or older.  The median age was 37 years. For every 100 females, there were 93.3 males.  For every 100 females age 18 and over, there were 89.2 males.

The median income for a household in the township was $78,953, and the median income for a family was $88,209 (these figures had risen to $84,026 and $102,174 respectively as of a 2007 estimate). Males had a median income of $61,260 versus $40,858 for females. The per capita income for the township was $32,349.  About 1.5% of families and 2.0% of the population were below the poverty line, including 1.5% of those under age 18 and 3.7% of those age 65 or over.

Government and politics

Montgomery Township is governed by a five-member Board of Supervisors. As of 2021, the Board of Supervisors is composed of:
Chairman Tanya C. Bamford
Vice-Chairman Matthew W. Quigg
Candyce Fleuhr Chimera
Annette M. Long
Beth A. Staab

Transportation

Major roads in Montgomery Township include U.S. Route 202, which passes southwest–northeast through the center of the township along an expressway-grade parkway; Pennsylvania Route 309, which runs north–south through the center of the township along Bethlehem Pike; U.S. Route 202 Business, which passes southwest–northeast through the township along Dekalb Pike, PA 309, and Doylestown Road; Pennsylvania Route 63, which runs northwest–southeast along the southwestern border of the township on Welsh Road; Pennsylvania Route 152, which passes north–south through the eastern corner of the township along Limekiln Pike; Pennsylvania Route 463, which runs northwest–southeast through the center of the township along Cowpath Road and Horsham Road; and County Line Road, which runs northwest–southeast along the northeastern border of the township with Bucks County.

Public safety
Ambulance Corps: Volunteer Medical Service Corps of Lansdale
Montgomery Township Police Department
Fire Department of Montgomery Township

Notable person
Winfield Scott Hancock, U.S. Army officer and Democratic nominee for President of the United States in 1880

References

External links

 Montgomery Township

1714 establishments in Pennsylvania
Townships in Montgomery County, Pennsylvania
Townships in Pennsylvania